This is a list of members of the Western Australian Legislative Council between 22 May 1997 and 21 May 2001:

Notes
 On 28 July 1998, Agricultural Nationals MLC Eric Charlton resigned. Nationals candidate Dexter Davies was elected in the resultant countback on 11 August 2008.
 Mining and Pastoral MLC Mark Nevill was elected as a representative of the Labor Party, but left the party on 23 August 1999 and sat as an independent.
 On 20 January 2000, South Metropolitan Labor MLC John Halden resigned in order to take up the position of party state president. Labor candidate Graham Giffard was elected in the resultant countback on 7 February 2000.
 Mining and Pastoral MLC Tom Helm was elected as a representative of the Labor Party, but left the party on 27 July 2000 and sat as an independent after losing preselection for the 2001 state election.

Members of Western Australian parliaments by term